Chalkal-e Sofla (also Romanized as Chālkal-e Soflá, Chāl Gal-e Soflá, and Chāl Kal-e Soflá) is a village in Jayedar Rural District, in the Central District of Pol-e Dokhtar County, Lorestan Province, Iran. At the 2006 census, its population was 135, in 22 families.

References 

Towns and villages in Pol-e Dokhtar County